The Wiesensee is an artificial lake, dammed up in 1971, in the Westerwald low mountain range. The lake covers about 80 hectares and lies in the area of Stahlhofen am Wiesensee's various centres on the lake's west shore, and Pottum on the north shore in the Westerwaldkreis. The community of Winnen borders on the lake to the southeast. The lake is a nature conservation area, and only parts of the water surface are open for recreational use.

It is a holiday and tourist destination. Several hotels, a luxury hotel and golf course lie near the shore. Many leisure facilities in the winter and summer make the Wiesensee attractive for athletes, young families and youth. Around the lake runs a roughly 6.5-km-long hiking path loop.

Regular events
Once every year, usually in the third week of October, the lake is fished clean, and completely drained. On this occasion the fishing festival is traditionally held.

Every three years, the Vereinsring Pottum ("club ring") stages a Sommernachtfest ("Summer Night Festival") at the lake.

Other 
In 2006, the Czech national football team stayed at Wiesensee during the world championship.

External links 
 Information about the Wiesensee on Stahlhofen am Wiesensee's website 
 Information about the Wiesensee on the Westerburg collective municipality's website 

Lakes of Rhineland-Palatinate
RWiesensee
Lakes of the Westerwald